Bonsound is a music company founded in 2004 and based in Montreal, Quebec, Canada. Bonsound is an artist management company, a record label, a booking agency, a concert promoter and a promotion & publicity agency.
Bonsound also operate two subsidiary: Bonsound Concerts, an event promoter featuring artists from Montreal and abroad; and Bonsound Promo, an agency which promotes projects not directly linked to Bonsound.

History

Founded in October 2004 by Gourmet Délice, Jean-Christian Aubry and Yanick Masse, Bonsound won the award for management company of the year at the industry gala of L'ADISQ (2008, 2013 and 2014). They also won two more Félix awards in 2014 for show producer of the year and web promo team of the year (Producteur de spectacles de l'année, Équipe promo Web).

Artists

 Beyries
 Christian Sean
 Corridor
 Dead Obies
 DJ Champion
 Duchess Says
 Elisapie
 Flying Hórses
 Geoffroy
 Groenland
 Joe Rocca
 Laurence-Anne
 Les Breastfeeders
 Les Deuxluxes
 Les Louanges
 Lisa LeBlanc
 Lumière
 Malajube
 Marie Davidson
 Mark Clennon
 Mélissa Laveaux
 Milk & Bone
 Misc
 Monogrenade
 P'tit Belliveau
 Philippe B
 Pierre Kwenders
 Radio Radio
 Safia Nolin
 Sophia Bel

References

External links
Bonsound official site

 
Record labels established in 2004
Canadian independent record labels
Indie rock record labels
Companies based in Montreal
Quebec record labels